Hyloxalus delatorreae is a species of frog in the family Dendrobatidae. It is endemic to the western slopes of the Andes in extreme northern Ecuador. It is only known from four nearby locations in the Carchi Province. Its natural habitats are wetlands and bogs, and it can also be found on areas of cattle ranching surrounded by forest remnants, at elevations of  asl. It is threatened by habitat loss caused by agriculture and logging.

Description
Males measure  and females  in snout–vent length.

References

delatorreae
Amphibians of the Andes
Amphibians of Ecuador
Endemic fauna of Ecuador
Amphibians described in 1995
Taxonomy articles created by Polbot